Saudi Arabia is scheduled to compete at the 2024 Summer Olympics in Paris from 26 July to 11 August 2024. It will be the nation's thirteenth appearance at the Summer Olympics except for Moscow 1980 as part of the United States-led boycott.

Competitors
The following is the list of number of competitors in the Games.

Equestrian

Saudi Arabia entered a squad of three jumping riders into the Olympic equestrian competition by securing the first of two available team spots at the International Equestrian Federation (FEI)-designated Olympic qualifier for Group F (Africa and Middle East) in Doha, Qatar.

Jumping

References

2024
Nations at the 2024 Summer Olympics
2024 in Saudi Arabian sport